Apantesis is a genus of tiger moths in the family Erebidae first described by Francis Walker in 1855. They are found in North and Central America.

As a result of phylogenetic research published in 2016, the genera Grammia, Holarctia, and Notarctia have been merged with Apantesis, and their species are now members of the genus Apantesis.

Species
The genus contains the following species:

 Apantesis allectans Ferguson, 1985
 Apantesis anna (Grote, 1863) – Anna tiger moth
 Apantesis arge (Drury, 1773) – arge moth
 Apantesis arizoniensis (Stretch, [1874])
 Apantesis behrii (Stretch, 1872)
 Apantesis blakei (Grote, 1864)
 Apantesis bolanderi (Stretch, 1872)
 Apantesis bowmani (Ferguson & Schmidt, 2007)
 Apantesis brillians Schmidt, 2009
 Apantesis carlotta Ferguson, 1985 – Carlotta's tiger moth
 Apantesis cervinoides (Strecker, 1876)
 Apantesis complicata (Walker, [1865])
 Apantesis doris (Boisduval, 1869) – Doris tiger moth
 Apantesis edwardsii (Stretch, 1872)
 Apantesis elongata (Stretch, 1885)
 Apantesis eureka Ferguson & Schmidt, 2007
 Apantesis f-pallida (Strecker, 1878)
 Apantesis favorita (Neumögen, 1890)
 Apantesis fergusoni Schmidt, 2009
 Apantesis figurata (Drury, 1773) – figured tiger moth
 Apantesis franconia (H. Edwards, 1888)
 Apantesis hewletti (Barnes & McDunnough, 1918)
 Apantesis incorrupta (H. Edwards, 1881)
 Apantesis margo Schmidt, 2009
 Apantesis nais (Drury, 1773) – Nais tiger moth
 Apantesis nevadensis (Grote & Robinson, 1866) – Nevada tiger moth
 Apantesis obliterata (Stretch, 1885)
 Apantesis ornata (Packard, 1864)
 Apantesis parthenice (W. Kirby, 1837) – parthenice tiger moth
 Apantesis phalerata (Harris, 1841) – harnessed tiger moth
 Apantesis philipiana Ferguson, 1985
 Apantesis phyllira (Drury, 1773) – phyllira tiger moth
 Apantesis placentia (J.E. Smith, 1797) – placentia tiger moth
 Apantesis proxima (Guérin-Méneville, [1844]) – Mexican tiger moth
 Apantesis quenseli (Paykull, 1793)
 Apantesis speciosa (Möschler, 1864)
 Apantesis ursina Schmidt, 2009
 Apantesis virgo (Linnaeus, 1758) – virgin tiger moth
 Apantesis virguncula (W. Kirby, 1837) – little virgin tiger moth
 Apantesis vittata (Fabricius, 1787) – banded tiger moth
 Apantesis williamsii (Dodge, 1871) – Williams' tiger moth
 Apantesis yavapai Schmidt, 2009
 Apantesis yukona Schmidt, 2009

References

Arctiina
Moth genera